Gibbs Island lies  south-west of Elephant Island in the South Shetland Islands of Antarctica. James Weddell, whose chart of the islands appeared in 1825, was apparently the first to use the current name of this island, discovered in 1821 by Russians who then named it Rozhnov Island (as it is known in Russia today).

Description
It is bordered to the south by Bransfield Strait and to the north by the Loper Channel. The isthmus of The Spit joins the main part of Gibbs Island in the west to Furse Peninsula in the east.

Important Bird Area
A 369 ha tract of land comprising Furse Peninsula, The Spit and a small ice-free area on Gibbs Island west of The Spit has been identified as an Important Bird Area (IBA) by BirdLife International because it supports breeding colonies of about 1700 pairs of macaroni and 190 pairs of chinstrap penguins, as well as over 18,000 pairs of southern fulmars.

See also 
 Cape Plenty
 List of Antarctic and subantarctic islands

References

Islands of the South Shetland Islands
Important Bird Areas of Antarctica
Seabird colonies
Penguin colonies